Arthur Edward Weston was an Australian Anglican priest in the mid Twentieth century.

Weston was educated at St John's College, Armidale and was ordained in 1922. After a curacy at All Saints' Cathedral, Bathurst he was Rector of Parkes then Archdeacon of Bathurst from 1934 to 1936. He was Rector of Norwood from 1936 to 1947 then Glenelg until 1957; Archdeacon of Strathalbyn from 1939 to 1953; and Dean of Adelaide from 1957 until 1966.

References

Deans of Adelaide
Archdeacons of Bathurst
Archdeacons of Strathalbyn
People educated at St John's College, Armidale